Uriménil is a commune in the Vosges department in Grand Est in northeastern France.

Geography
The Côney flows southwest through the middle of the commune, crosses the village, and forms part of the commune's southwestern border.

See also
Communes of the Vosges department

References

Communes of Vosges (department)